Hyloxalinae is a subfamily of frogs in the family Dendrobatidae.

Genera 
It contains three genera:

 Ectopoglossus
 Hyloxalus
 Paruwrobates

References 

Amphibian subfamilies
Poison dart frogs